In folk magic and witchcraft, a poppet (also known as poppit, moppet, mommet or pippy) is a doll made to represent a person, for casting spells on that person or to aid that person through magic. They are occasionally found lodged in chimneys. These dolls may be fashioned from such materials as a carved root, grain or corn shafts, a fruit, paper, wax, a potato, clay, branches, or cloth stuffed with herbs with the intent that any actions performed upon the effigy will be transferred to the subject based on sympathetic magic. Poppets are also used as kitchen witch figures.

Etymology 

The word poppet is an older spelling of puppet, from Middle English popet, meaning a small child or a doll. In British English it continues to hold this meaning. Poppet is also a chiefly British term of endearment or diminutive referring to a young child or girl, much like the words "dear" or "sweetie."

See also

 Corn dolly
 Corn husk doll
 Hoko doll
 Motanka doll
 Voodoo doll
 Witch bottle

References

Talismans
Amulets
Anthropology
European witchcraft
Traditional dolls
Dolls
English folklore
Magic items
Cunning folk